The Scarlet and the Black is a 1983 film about the story of Monsignor Hugh O'Flaherty.

It can also refer to:

 Scarlet and Black (TV series), a dramatization of the novel by Stendhal
 Scarlet and Black, the college newspaper of Grinnell College, Iowa
 Scarlett and Black, a UK pop duo from the 1980s

See also 
The Red and the Black,  the novel by Stendhal
Red and black (disambiguation)